Andrew Glover (born August 12, 1967) is a former  professional American football player. A 6'6",  tight end from the Grambling State University Tigers, Glover was drafted by the Los Angeles Raiders in the 1991 NFL Draft.  Glover attended East Ascension High School in Gonzales, LA.

Glover and his wife, Mary, were the main plaintiffs in a class action suit against the NFL for its negligence in preventing brain injuries to its players.

References

1967 births
Living people
American football tight ends
Grambling State Tigers football players
Los Angeles Raiders players
Oakland Raiders players
Minnesota Vikings players
New Orleans Saints players
Players of American football from New Orleans
People from Gonzales, Louisiana